The Dawkins Line Rail Trail is an  rail trail in Johnson and Magoffin Counties in Kentucky. The multi-use trail, suitable for biking, walking, and horseback riding, occupies an abandoned rail corridor that was constructed in the early 20th century for the Dawkins Lumber Company. It is the longest rail trail in Kentucky.

History

The name of the trail was derived from the Dawkins Lumber Company, which incorporated the Big Sandy and Kentucky River Railroad (BS&K) to construct the railroad in 1912. This rail corridor was developed as means of transportation for company employees and for the extraction of timber from remote areas. After the stock market crash of 1929, the BS&K was dissolved and the Chesapeake and Ohio Railway (C&O) acquired the railroad's stock on September 22, 1930.

After the construction of a tunnel at Carver in 1949, the rail corridor was further expanded into Breathitt County.

The rail line right-of-way was owned by CSX in 2002 when it was purchased by the R.J. Corman Railroad Group. R.J. Corman decided to abandon the 36 mile rail line in November 2004. In 2006, the Kentucky General Assembly provided the initial funds necessary to convert the abandoned right-of-way into a rail trail. In 2011, the right-of-way was purchased from R.J. Corman and the project began to move forward. The Kentucky State Parks received a multi-county coal severance grant of $500,000 to help support the development of the trail. The Kentucky Transportation Cabinet provided the Department of Parks with $2 million in transportation program funding for the first phase, as well as approximately $285,000 in Transportation Enhancement funding for trailheads.

After the construction of Phase One of the rail trail was completed, the park opened to the public on June 15, 2013. When Phase Two of the project is constructed, the trail will extend to Evanston in Breathitt County. When completed, the Dawkins Line Rail Trail will be a total of 36-miles (57.9 km) long.

Future work (4th QTR 2014 or later) involves restoring abandoned railbed from Royalton southwest to near the tunnel at the Magoffin and Breathitt County line.

See also

List of rail trails
Jenny Wiley State Resort Park
Paintsville Lake State Park
Pine Mountain State Scenic Trail

References

External links
Kentucky State Parks Brochure: Dawkins Line Rail Trail (pdf)
Dawkins Line Rail Trail Official Map---new version (pdf)
Dawkins Line Rail Trail Official Map---old version (pdf)
Dawkins Line Rail Trail Opening Announcement Presentation (pdf, 8MB)
Stage 1 Construction Presentation (pdf, 12MB) from Commonwealth of Kentucky
Dawkins Line Rail Trail page at Kentucky State Parks website
Kentucky Transportation Cabinet (documents containing "Dawkins")
Rail Abandonment Environmental Assessment Decision (contains poor map on last page of pdf)
Abandoned: History of Dawkins Subdivision of C&O Railroad
Dawkins Line Rail Trail Feasibility Study (pdf, 9MB), from Summit Engineering for Big Sandy Area Development District and Big Lovely Mountain Trail Authority

Rail trails in Kentucky
2013 establishments in Kentucky
Protected areas of Johnson County, Kentucky
Protected areas of Magoffin County, Kentucky
Protected areas established in 2013
State parks of Kentucky
Transportation in Johnson County, Kentucky
Transportation in Magoffin County, Kentucky